The 2009 Food City 500 was the fifth race of the 2009 NASCAR Sprint Cup season. This 500 lap,  race took place on March 22 of that year at the  Bristol Motor Speedway in Bristol, Tennessee, and was telecast on Fox beginning at 1:30 PM US EDT, with radio broadcasting being handled by Performance Racing Network (terrestrial) and Sirius XM Radio (satellite) beginning at 1 PM US EDT.

This race was the last to use the 2008 season Top 35 in owners points rule.  Beginning with the next race, the Goody's Fast Pain Relief 500, each week's current standings will be used to determine automatic qualifiers for each week's race.

Entry list

Qualifying
Mark Martin won his second pole in a row. He will start alongside Ryan Newman and teammate Jimmie Johnson in third.

Full qualifying results

Pre-Race Notes
 Michael Waltrip smacked the wall in practice and was forced to go to a backup car.
 The car of Kevin Harvick was so tight it would not turn at about 100 miles per hour. After inspecting the car, it was determined that the cause was the engine rubbing against the tires, but Harvick did not go to a backup car.
 Bobby Labonte and Greg Biffle both spun off turn 4 at one point in practice, but both cars suffered minor to no damage.

Race recap
Bobby Allison, a NASCAR Cup Series driver who drove in the formative years in NASCAR, became the honorary starter for this race. He would give out the green flag and later surrendered his "duty" to the regular starter for the other flags.

The pundits predicted that Carl Edwards, Jeff Gordon and Kyle Busch would be triumphant in the race while Mark Martin, Jamie McMurray, David Ragan and Brian Vickers didn't have much of a chance to finish the race in a respectable position.

Kyle Busch led 378 laps en route to his second victory of 2009. JGR teammate Denny Hamlin finished second, while Hendrick Motorsports teammates Jimmie Johnson and Jeff Gordon finished third and fourth, while Kasey Kahne rounded up the top 5. Jeff Gordon still led the points standings, and got his 4th top-10 and 3rd top-5 of the season.

Race results

References

Food City 500
Food City 500
NASCAR races at Bristol Motor Speedway
March 2009 sports events in the United States